Ladder yarn or train tracks yarn is a type of novelty yarn.  It is constructed like ladders, with a horizontal stripe of material suspended between two thinner threads, alternating with gaps.  Sometimes a contrasting strand is fed through the gaps to produce another look.

References 

Yarn